Zdráhal (Czech feminine: Zdráhalová) is a surname. Notable people with the surname include:

 Jan Zdráhal (born 1991), Czech ice hockey player
 Luděk Zdráhal (born 1969), Czech footballer
 Nikola Zdráhalová (born 1996), Czech speed skater
 Patrik Zdráhal (born 1995), Czech ice hockey player
 Pavel Zdráhal (born 1971), Czech ice hockey player

See also
 

Czech-language surnames